This article is a collection of nationwide public opinion polls that were conducted relating to the 2008 Republican presidential candidates, typically using standard statistical methodology.  The public is generally sampled by land-line telephone only, and sometimes asked only about their opinion of certain candidates.

2008

2007

Sep.–Dec. 2007

Jan.–Aug. 2007

Before 2007

Three-way contest

Two-way contest

Statewide primary polls

Other polls

Candidate qualities

Ideology perceptions

Acceptable president

See also 
 Republican Party (United States)

Notes 

Republican
2008 United States Republican presidential primaries